Montreal-style smoked meat, Montreal smoked meat or simply smoked meat in Quebec (French: smoked-meat; sometimes viande fumée or even bœuf mariné: Literally “marinated beef”) is a type of kosher-style deli meat product made by salting and curing beef brisket with spices. The brisket is allowed to absorb the flavours over a week, is then hot smoked to cook through, and finally is steamed to completion. This is a variation on corned beef and is similar to pastrami.

Preparation
Although the preparation method may be similar to New York pastrami, Montreal smoked meat is cured in seasoning with more cracked peppercorns and savoury flavourings, such as coriander, garlic, and mustard seeds, and significantly less sugar. The recipe for Montreal steak seasoning is based on the seasoning mixture for Montreal smoked meat.

Montreal smoked meat is made with variable-fat brisket, whereas pastrami is more commonly made with the fat-marbled navel/plate cut. Montreal smoked meat is typically served in the form of a light-rye bread sandwich accompanied with yellow mustard. While some Montreal smoked meat is brine-cured like corned beef, with spices applied later, many smoked meat establishments prefer dry-curing directly with salt and spices.

History
The origins of Montreal smoked meat are uncertain and likely unresolvable. Many have laid claims to the creation or introduction of smoked meat into Montreal. Regardless, all of these stories indicate the creators are of the Jewish Diaspora from Romania or Eastern Europe:
 Some point to Benjamin Kravitz, who founded Bens De Luxe Delicatessen & Restaurant in 1910, as the introducer of Montreal smoked meat. According to the Kravitz family, he used a brisket-curing method he recalled being practised by Lithuanian farmers. His first smoked meat sandwiches were made and sold from his wife's fruit and candy store.
 According to Eiran Harris, a Montreal historian, Herman Rees Roth from New York may have created the first smoked meat sandwich in 1908, selling them from his deli, the British American Delicatessen Store.
 In another claim by Bill Brownstein, the smoked meat was brought over in 1902 by Itzak Rudman, who was an accomplished salami and smoked meat maker who had a shop on de Bullion Street (formerly Cadieux Street).
 In yet another possibility, a butcher by the name of Aaron Sanft who arrived from Iași, Romania, in 1884 founded Montreal's first kosher butcher and likely made smoked meat in the Romanian style similar to pastrama.

Serving

Warm Montreal smoked meat is always sliced by hand to maintain its form, since doing so with a meat slicer would cause the tender meat to disintegrate. Whole briskets are kept steaming and sliced up on demand when ordered in the restaurant to maintain its temperature.

Even when hand-cut, Montreal smoked meat produces a considerable amount of broken bits when sliced. These pieces are gathered together and commonly served with French fries, cheese curds, and gravy as smoked meat poutine or served over spaghetti with Bolognese sauce or even pizza.

The customer can specify the amount of fat in the smoked meat:
 Lean: the lean and less flavourful end. Relatively healthful but dry.
 Medium and medium fat: the most popular cuts from the middle of the brisket. Occasionally, a sliced mix of lean and fat meats.
 Old-fashioned: a cut between medium and fatty and often cut a bit thicker.
 Fat: from the fat end of the brisket
 Speck: consists solely of the spiced subcutaneous fat from the whole brisket without meat.

Cultural identity
Montreal smoked meat is offered in many diners and fast food restaurant chains in Montreal, the rest of Quebec, and the rest of Canada. Along with bagels, smoked meat has been popular in Montreal since the 19th century and is identified as emblematic of the city's cuisine. Despite the food's origins in, and association with, Montreal's Jewish community and, contrary to what is sometimes asserted, delis are seldom certified as kosher.

Montreal writer Mordecai Richler, in his novel Barney's Version, sardonically described the spices used in the smoked meat at Schwartz's deli as a "maddening aphrodisiac" to be bottled and copyrighted as "Nectar of Judea".

Montreal smoked meat has also been added in to Quebec dishes such as poutine.

See also

 Deli meat
 Montreal steak seasoning
 Cuisine of Quebec
 Montreal-style bagel
 Reuben sandwich
 Pastrami
 Corned beef
 List of sandwiches
 List of smoked foods

References

Ashkenazi Jewish culture in Montreal
Smoked meat
Jewish cuisine
Lunch meat
Sandwiches
Montreal cuisine
Cuisine of Quebec
Canadian cuisine
Jewish Canadian cuisine
Jews and Judaism in Montreal
Romanian-Jewish culture in Canada